Aurangabad railway station (code AWB) is a railway station located on the –Manmad section which mainly services Aurangabad City. This railway station comes under the Nanded division of the South Central Railway zone and has rail connectivity with major cities such as Parbhani, Nanded, Hyderabad, Delhi, Nizamabad, Nagpur, Nasik, Pune, Gangakhed, Purna, Udgir, Raichur jn, Ahmedabad, Ahmednagar, Kadpa, and Latur Road.

History

Aurangabad railway station was opened in 1900. It was made by the 7th Nizam of Hyderabad Mir Osman Ali Khan. His highness Nizam made Godavari Valley Railway Company under the Nizam's Guaranteed State Railway. In 1876 work began during the regime of 6th Nizam Mir Mahbub Ali Khan. The first line between Hyderabad and Bezwada was constructed.

The first broad-gauge line between Secunderabad and Wadi was constructed in 1885. Hyderabad–Manmad line work completed in 1900. Hyderabad–Jaipur metre-gauge line work started and was completed in 1906.

In 1950 Nizam's Guaranteed Railway was nationalized and merged in India railway. In 1992, 94-metre-gauge work of Secunderabad–Manmad line was completed. In 2004, the Nizam railway line was made broad gauge by Indian Railways.

Administration

Aurangabad railway station falls under Nanded Sub-Division of South Central Railway. It is situated in between Manmad Junction (Central Railway) to Hazur Sahib Nanded station (South Central Railway) line. Aurangabad railway station is the only station in Nanded division that has A1 category status. Aurangabad station is one of the model stations in the country. It has 5 platforms of which 3 are used for passenger services. All four are covered. Aurangabad station has many facilities but it could use expansion because the city is the tourism capital of Maharashtra.

Connectivity

Aurangabad has rail connectivity with Mumbai, Delhi, Hyderabad, Chennai Central, Nizamabad, Latur Road, Nanded, Nagpur, Nasik, Pune, Yadgir, Raichur, Hyderabad, Secunderabad, Ahmedabad, Ahmednagar, Visakhapatnam. The Aurangabad Jan Shatabdi Express is the fastest train connecting it with Mumbai.Aurangabad Renigunta weekly express is train connects the aurangabad to major railway stations like Raichur and Yadgir.
Some of the important trains from Aurangabad are Sachkhand Express, Devagiri Express, Ajanta Express, Aurangabad Jan Shatabdi

Aurangbad has two more stations within the city limits. One is Chikhalthana railway station the other is newly constructed Mukundwadi railway station.

References

External links

 website

Nanded railway division
Railway stations in Aurangabad district, Maharashtra
Transport in Aurangabad, Maharashtra